Gordana Jovanovic Dolecek is an electronics engineer specializing in digital filters. Originally from Yugoslavia, she works in Mexico as a professor and researcher at the National Institute of Astrophysics, Optics and Electronics (INAOE) in Puebla.

Education and career
Dolecek earned a bachelor's degree in electrical engineering from the University of Sarajevo in 1969. After a master's degree from the University of Belgrade in 1975, she returned to the University of Sarajevo for her Ph.D, completed in 1981.

She worked as a research assistant at Energoinvest beginning in 1969, and in 1971 became a teaching and research assistant at the University of Sarajevo. She became an assistant professor there in 1977, one of the founding members of the department of telecommunications. She was promoted to associate professor in 1985, and full professor in 1991. She alternately chaired the departments of telecommunications and communications systems from 1980 to 1993.

In 1993 she moved to the Mihajlo Pupin Institute of the University of Belgrade, and in 1995 she took her present position in Mexico at INAOE.

Books
Dolecek is the author of the book Random Signals and Processes Primer with MATLAB (Springer, 2012). Her edited volumes include Multirate Systems: Design and Applications (Idea Group, 2002) and Advances in Multirate Systems (Springer, 2017).

Recognition
Dolecek is a member of the Mexican Academy of Sciences, elected in 2005.

Personal life
Dolecek was married to mechanical engineering professor Vlatko Doleček. Their daughter, coding theorist Lara Dolecek, is a professor in California at the UCLA Henry Samueli School of Engineering and Applied Science.

References

External links
Home page

Year of birth missing (living people)
Living people
University of Sarajevo alumni
University of Belgrade alumni
Academic staff of the University of Sarajevo
Yugoslav engineers
Mexican engineers
Mexican women engineers
Electronics engineers
Members of the Mexican Academy of Sciences